The discography of Joseph Bruce, an American rapper better known by his hip hop persona of the wicked clown Violent J, consists of one studio album, one single, and three extended plays. Music videos and collaborations are also included, as are film and television appearances, home video releases, and literary releases. In addition to his solo career, Bruce has also been involved with seven hip hop groups; JJ Boys (1988-1989), Inner City Posse (1989-1991), Insane Clown Posse (1991-present), Golden Goldies (1995), Dark Lotus (1998-2017), Psychopathic Rydas (1999-2017), Soopa Villainz (2002-2005) and The Killjoy Club (2013-2016).

He has gained success predominantly as a member of the duo Insane Clown Posse, where he has earned three gold albums and two platinum albums. Along with member Joseph Utsler, Bruce founded the independent record label Psychopathic Records with Alex Abbiss as manager in 1991. He has also produced, written, and starred in the feature films Big Money Hustlas and Big Money Rustlas.

Solo albums

Studio albums

Extended plays

Singles

Group albums

With Inner City Posse

With Insane Clown Posse

With Golden Goldies

With Dark Lotus

With Psychopathic Rydas

With Soopa Villainz

W/The Killjoy Club

Guest appearances

Solo

w/Shaggy 2 Dope (Insane Clown Posse)

Anybody Killa: Hatchet Warrior (2003) - "Gang Related", "Sticky Icky Situation"
Anybody Killa: Dirty History (2004) - "Down Here", "Charlie Brown" 
Blaze Ya Dead Homie: 1 Less G n da Hood - (2001) "Str8 Outta Detroit", "Given Half The Chance", "Hatchet Execution"
Blaze Ya Dead Homie: Colton Grundy: The Undying - (2004) "Mr. Dead Folx"
Blaze Ya Dead Homie: Clockwork Gray - (2007) "Zip Codes 'n Time Zones"
Boondox: South of Hell (2010) - "Watch Your Back"
Boondox: The Harvest (2006)
Boondox: Krimson Creek (2008) - "Freak Bitch", "Trailer Park Creepin'"
Boondox: PunkinHed (2007) - "Sleep Stalker"
Cold 187um  a.k.a. Big Hutch: From Pomona With Love: The Mixtape (2011) - "Rock The Hate"
Esham: Repentance (album) (2003) - "Dem Boyz"
Esham: Race Riot (compilation) (2000) - "Cunt Killer"
Jumpsteady: Chaos Theory (album) (2002) - "Joke Ya Mind"
Jumpsteady: Master of the Flying Guillotine (album) (2005) - "Ima"
Prozak:Tales from the Sick (2008) - "Insane"
Shaggy 2 Dope: F.T.F.O. (2006) - "Fuck the Fuck Off", "They Shootin'" and "Half Full"
Shaggy 2 Dope: Fuck Off! (1994) - "3 Rings","Fuck Off" and "Clown Love"
Twiztid: Mirror Mirror - (2002) "Leff Field"
Twiztid: The Green Book - (2004) "Marsh Lagoon"
Twiztid: Cryptic Collection Vol. 3 - 2004 "Lil Secret"
Twiztid: Man's Myth (Vol. 1) - (2005) - "So High", "Get Ready"
Twiztid: Mutant (Vol. 2) - (2005) - "Manikin"
Twiztid: The Toxic Terror Tour EP - (2008) - "Sex, Drugs, Money & Murder Ver. 2"
Zug Izland: Cracked Tiles - (2003) - "Fire"
Ol' Dirty Bastard: The Trials and Tribulations of Russell Jones - "Dirty & Stinkin'" & "Dirty & Stinkin'(Remix)"
Myzery: Demon Angel - (2014) - "Knocking On Heaven's Door"

Original contributions to compilation

Solo

w/Shaggy 2 Dope

Psychopathics from Outer Space (2000) - "The Dirtball", "$50 Bucks", "Sleepwalker", "R-U-A Ryda?(as Psychopathic Rydas)", "Slim Anus", "Dead End(w/Ice-T)", "Red Neck Hoe '99(w/Twiztid)", "The Amazing Maze", "Who?(as Psychopathic Rydas)", "Meatcleaver(w/Twiztid & Myzery)"
Psychopathics from Outer Space 2 (2003) - "Demon Face", "Conquer"(as Soopa Villainz featuring ABK), "Some Fuckin' How", "Graverobbers"(as Dark Lotus), "Wicked Wild featuring Esham, Fish & Gritz and Fresh Kid Ice of 2-Live Crew", "Mr. Sesame Seed", "Free Studio"(as Psychopathic Family)
Psychopathics from Outer Space 3 (2007) - "Put It Down", "If I Was God", "Last Day Alive(Shaggy 2 Dope, Monoxide & Boondox)"
The Butcher Shop (2008) - "Global Warming"
Let 'Em Bleed: The Mixxtape, Vol. 1 (2008) - "Frankenstein", "Global Warming"
Let 'Em Bleed: The Mixxtape, Vol. 2 (2008) - "In Love With A Hooker featuring Esham", "4Ever Detroit", "Dead Man Walking"
Let 'Em Bleed: The Mixxtape, Vol. 3 (2008) - "Duke Of The Wicked", "Kept Grindin"
Let 'Em Bleed: The Mixxtape, Vol. 4 (2009) - "I Shot a Hater"

Videography
ICP's Strangle-Mania (1995), as Diamond Donovan '3D' Douglas
Shockumentary (1997), as Violent J
ECW Hardcore Heaven (1997), as Violent J
WWF Summerslam (1998), as Violent J
Backstage Sluts (1999), as Violent J
Strangle Mania 2 (1999), as Diamond Donovan '3D' Douglas
WCW Road Wild (1999), as Violent J
WCW Fall Brawl (1999), as Violent J
Born Twiztid: Beyond the Freakshow (2000), as Violent J
JCW, Volume 1 (2000), as Diamond Donovan '3D' Douglas, and as Violent J
JCW, Volume 2 (2001), as "Diamond Donovan '3D' Douglas, and as Violent J
XPW Redemption (2001), as Violent J
JCW, Volume 3 (2003), as "Diamond Donovan '3D' Douglas, and as Violent J
Bootlegged in L.A. (2003), as Violent J
Psychopathic: The Videos (2007), as Violent J
JCW: SlamTV - Episodes 1 thru 9 (2007), as Diamond Donovan '3D' Douglas
JCW: SlamTV - Episodes 10 thru 15 featuring Bloodymania (2007), as Diamond Donovan '3D' Douglas, and as Violent J

Filmography

Film appearances
Big Money Hustlas (2000), as Big Baby Sweets/Ape Boy
Bowling Balls (2004), as J
Death Racers (2008), as Violent J
Big Money Rustlas (2009), as Big Baby Chips

Television and internet programs
ECW Hardcore TV (1997), as Violent J
Monday Night Raw (1998), as Violent J
WCW Monday Nitro (1999–2000), as Violent J
WCW Thunder (1999), as Violent J
The Shaggy Show (1999), as Violent J
Mad TV (2002), as Violent J
NWA Total Nonstop Action (2004), as Violent J
Aqua Teen Hunger Force (2010), as Violent J

Bibliography
Behind the Paint by Violent J with Hobey Echlin (2003) - Autobiography

Music videos

References

Hip hop discographies
Discographies of American artists